Prisoners of pain is the second album by the Croatian hip hop group, Ugly Leaders. The album was released in 1994 by Croatia Records and Deynken Music.

Controversy
The album had controversy due to its lyrics and language. Croatian radio stations didn't play the album because of its vulgar language and themes. Half the songs were taped on English so group could use their freedom of expression and still get played on the radio and TV.

Track listing

References

1994 albums
Ugly Leaders albums